Edgar Albert Guest (20 August 1881 – 5 August 1959) was a British-born American poet who became known as the People's Poet. His poems often had an inspirational and optimistic view of everyday life.

Early life
Guest was born in Birmingham, England in 1881. In 1891, his family moved from England to Detroit, Michigan, where Guest lived until he died.

Career
After he began at the Detroit Free Press as a copy boy and then a reporter, his first poem appeared on 11 December 1898. He became a naturalized citizen in 1902. For 40 years, Guest was widely read throughout North America, and his sentimental, optimistic poems were in the same vein as the light verse of Nick Kenny, who wrote syndicated columns during the same decades.

From his first published work in the Detroit Free Press until his death in 1959, Guest penned some 11,000 poems which were syndicated in some 300 newspapers and collected in more than 20 books, including A Heap o' Livin''' (1916) and Just Folks (1923–1957). Guest was made Poet Laureate of Michigan, the only poet to have been awarded the title.

His popularity led to a weekly Detroit radio show which he hosted from 1931 until 1942, followed by a 1951 NBC television series, A Guest in Your House. He also had a thrice-weekly transcribed radio program that began January 15, 1941, and was sponsored by Land O'Lakes Creameries. The program featured singer Eddy Howard.

Guest was made a Freemason in Detroit, where he was a lifetime member of Ashlar Lodge No. 91. In honor of Guest's devotion to the Craft, community, and humanity in general, the Grand Lodge of Free and Accepted Masons of Michigan established the Edgar A. Guest Award for lodges to present to non-Masons within the community who have demonstrated distinguished service to the community and their fellow man.

Guest was also a member of The Tin Whistles.

When Guest died in 1959, he was buried in Detroit's Woodlawn Cemetery.

His grandniece Judith Guest is a novelist best known for Ordinary People (1976).

Reputation
Guest's work still occasionally appears in periodicals such as Reader's Digest, and some favorites, such as "Myself" and "Thanksgiving," are still studied today. However, in one of the most quoted appraisals of his work, Dorothy Parker reputedly said:  "I'd rather flunk my Wassermann test than read a poem by Edgar Guest."

In popular culture
Edgar Guest is a favorite poet of Edith Bunker from the TV show All in the Family. She quotes him in a few episodes, including "Prisoner in the House", first broadcast on 4 January 1975.

Guest is mentioned several times in the eleventh book in Lemony Snicket's A Series of Unfortunate Events, The Grim Grotto. Klaus Baudelaire recalls how he was once given a Hobson's choice of doing the dishes or reading Guest's poetry, and the villainous crew of Count Olaf's submarine Carmelita wear badges depicting Guest (in contrast to the heroes' badges depicting Herman Melville). The book's author goes out of his way to praise Melville and disparage Guest as a "writer of limited skill, who wrote awkward, tedious poetry on hopelessly sentimental topics."

In the novel I Am Legend, the main character Robert Neville sardonically comments on his own internal monologue: "The last man in the world is Edgar Guest".

Guest's poem "It Couldn't Be Done" was recited by Idris Elba on the BBC's Sports Personality of the Year Award on 16 December 2012 whilst celebrating Team GB and Paralympics GB winning the team award for 2012.

Guest's poem "The Epicure" was reproduced in Mad #84 (January 1964) with new illustrations by Don Martin.

Guest's poem "See It Through," was used in a Chrysler 300 commercial.

Guest's poem "It Couldn't Be Done" was used in an Audi commercial.

Tracey Gold did read Guest's poem "A Child of Mine" during the funeral of Judith Barsi.

"It Couldn't Be Done" inspired a parody, "They Said That It Couldn't Be Done", by comedian Benny Hill.

Guest's poem "Equipment" was used in part for inspiration in the work of J.I.D. on his single "Skeegee".

WorksHome Rhymes, from Breakfast Table Chat (1909)The Panama Canal (1915)A Heap o' Livin' (1916)Just Glad Things (1916)Just Folks (1917)Over Here (1918)Poems of Patriotism (1918)The Path to Home (1919)A Dozen New Poems (1920)Sunny Songs (1920)Keep Going (Don't Quit) (1921)When Day Is Done (1921)Don't Quit (3 March 1921)All That Matters (1922)Making The House A Home (1922)The Passing Throng (1923)Rhymes of Childhood (1924)Mother (1925)The Light of Faith (1926)The Secret of The Ages (1926)You (1927)Harbor Lights of Home (1928)You Can't Live Your Own Life (1929)Poems for the Home Folks (1930)The Friendly Way (1931)Faith (1932)Life's Highway (1933)Collected Verse of Edgar Guest (1934)All in a Lifetime (1938)Between You and Me: My Philosophy of Life (1938)Today and Tomorrow (1942)Living the Years (1949)Sermons We SeeCourageThe Proof of WorthSee It ThroughLife's SlackerTeam WorkCan'tAt ChristmasThings Work OutHave you Earned your TomorrowGirl I Hope You Understand''

References

External links 

 
 
 
 
 American Academy of Poets: Edgar Guest
 Sofine's Edgar Guest Collection
 Edgar Guest on Poemist.com
 Edgar Guest on Poeticous.com

1881 births
1959 deaths
20th-century American poets
20th-century American non-fiction writers
Burials at Woodlawn Cemetery (Detroit)
Detroit Free Press people
English emigrants to the United States
Poets from Michigan
Poets Laureate of Michigan
Writers from Birmingham, West Midlands
Writers from Detroit